Derek L. Pagel (born October 24, 1979) is a former American football safety in the National Football League (NFL) for the New York Jets and Dallas Cowboys. He was drafted by the New York Jets in the fifth round of the 2003 NFL Draft. He played college football at the University of Iowa.

Early years
Pagel attended Nashua-Plainfield High School, where he played football and basketball. He walked-on at the University of Iowa. He played mostly on special teams in his first 2 seasons.

As a junior, he became a starter at free safety playing alongside Bob Sanders and recorded one interception. As a senior, he tied with Jovon Johnson for the team lead with 4 interceptions, including one returned for a touchdown.

Professional career

New York Jets
Pagel was selected by the New York Jets in the 5th round (140th overall) of the 2003 NFL Draft. On November 9, 2004, he was placed on the injured reserve list with a left calf injury he suffered in the eighth game against the Buffalo Bills, finishing the season with 5 special teams tackles. He was waived on August 8, 2005.

Dallas Cowboys
On August 9, 2005, he was claimed off waivers by the Dallas Cowboys. He suffered a torn rotator cuff injury in the first preseason game against the Arizona Cardinals and was placed on the injured reserve list on August 18. He was released on March 2, 2006.

Personal life
Pagel wrote the book "Growing Up Hawkeye".

References

1979 births
Living people
People from Chickasaw County, Iowa
Players of American football from Iowa
American football safeties
Iowa Hawkeyes football players
New York Jets players
Dallas Cowboys players